Charles William Frederick Hope, 3rd Marquess of Linlithgow MC (7 April 1912 – 7 April 1987) was a British peer and businessman.

Early years
The son of Victor Hope, 2nd Marquess of Linlithgow. He was the elder twin brother of John Hope, 1st Baron Glendevon. His first wife, Vivien Kenyon-Slaney, daughter of Major Robert Orlando Rodolph Kenyon-Slaney, died on 23 September 1963. He later married Judith Lawson, daughter of Stanley Matthew Lawson, in 1965.

He was educated at Ludgrove School and Eton College. Lord Hope fought in WWII and received the Military Cross for his service. He was a member of the 51st (Highland) Division. In 1940, he was taken prisoner at Dunkirk and held at Colditz Castle.

After the war Lord Hope went into finance and was a director of Eagle Star Insurance.

In 1974, Lord Hope created The Hopetoun House Preservation Trust to ensure Hopetoun House and the estate were preserved for future generations.

Marriages and children

Lord Linlithgow was married twice. His first marriage was to Vivien Kenyon-Slaney, daughter of Major Robert Orlando Rodolph Kenyon-Slaney and Lady Mary Cecilia Rhodesia Hamilton, on 24 July 1939. The couple had two children together.

 Lady Mary Sarah-Jane Hope (25 May 1940 – 8 November 2012); married Michael Gordon Learoyd, son of Philip Halkett Brook Learoyd, on 3 October 1967. The couple had one son and were divorced in 1978.
 Adrian John Charles Hope, 4th Marquess of Linlithgow (born 1 July 1946)

Lady Linlithgow died on 23 September 1963. Lord Linlithgow married, secondly, Judith Lawson, daughter of Stanley Matthew Lawson, on 15 February 1965.

He died on his 75th birthday on 7 April 1987, and was succeeded in the marquessate by his son, Adrian.

References

External links

Video of the 1939 Wedding of Lord Hope and Vivien Kenyon-Slaney
The Gazetteer of Scotland Biography and Photo

1912 births
1987 deaths
Hope family
Prisoners of war held at Colditz Castle
Marquesses of Linlithgow
Scottish twins
Recipients of the Military Cross
People educated at Eton College
People educated at Ludgrove School
Alumni of Christ Church, Oxford